This is a list of islets, islands, and rocks of the island of Cyprus.

Ayios Georgios (Yeoryios, Nisída Agíou Georgíou), islet located in the Akamas peninsula, 
Aspro Island (Nisi Aspro), island located in the Karpasia peninsula, 
Dhemoniaris, island located in the Karpasia peninsula, 
Galounia, islet located in the Karpasia peninsula
Glaros (Nisída Gláros), islet located in the Karpasia peninsula, 
Glykiotissa (Nisída Glykiótissa), island located in Kyrenia region, 
Kleides Islands, rocky islets at the north, 
Khamili (Nisída tis Chamilís), islet located in the Akamas peninsula, 
Jila (Nisída Kíla), island located in the Karpasia peninsula, 
Kalamoulia (Nisída tis Chamilís), islet located near Karavas, 
Kannoudhia (Nisída Kannoúdia), islet located in the Akamas peninsula, 
Kemathion, islet located in the Karpasia peninsula
Khoti (Nisída Chotí), islet located next to Ayios Amvrosios,  
Kionos (Nisída Kióni), islet located in the Akamas peninsula, 
Koppo (Nisída Kóppos), islet located in the Akamas peninsula, 
Kordhylia (Nisídes Kordýlia), island located in the Karpasia peninsula, 
Kormakitis (Nisída Kormakítis), islet located in the cape Kormakitis,  
Koutisopetri, islet located in the Karpasia peninsula
Koutoulis, islet located in the Karpasia peninsula, 
Lefkonisos (Nisída Lefkónisos), islet located in the Karpasia peninsula, 
Mazaki (Nisída Mazáki), island located in the Akamas peninsula, 
Maniji (Manikis), islets located near Peyia, 
Moulia (Vráchoi Mouliá), rocks located near Paphos, 
Nisarka (Nissaria), islet located near Paphos, 
Nisha (Nichchia), islet located in the Karpasia peninsula, 
Palloura, point located in the Karpasia peninsula, 
, islet located next to Pyrgos, 
Petra Tou Romiou, rocks located near Kouklia, 
Scales (Nisída Skáles), islet located in the Karpasia peninsula, 
Sernos (Chernos), islet located in the Karpasia peninsula, 
Skaloudhia (Nisídes Skaloúdia), island located in the Karpasia peninsula, 
Skamni, islet located in the Karpasia peninsula, 
Vatha, islet located south to Limassol
Yeronisos, island located near Peyia, 
Yeronisos, islet located near Karavas

See also
List of islands of Greece

References 

 
Islands
Cyprus
Cyprus islets